Cluck may refer to:

 Clucking, reproduction-related vocal behavior of female chicken
 Cluck, domestic hen perceived as unproductive of eggs due to brooding phase of avian incubation behavior
 Cluck (Hunter × Hunter), a fictional character in the manga series Hunter × Hunter